Registered mail is a mail service offered by postal services in many countries which allows the sender proof of mailing via a mailing receipt and, upon request, electronic verification that an article was delivered or that a delivery attempt was made. Depending on the country, additional services may also be available, such as:
 a chain of custody, where the posted item has its details recorded in a register to enable its location to be tracked, sometimes with added insurance to cover loss;
return receipt, called an Avis de réception, which provides a postcard or electronic notification with the date of delivery and recipient signature;
restricted delivery, which confirms that only a specified person, or authorized agent, will receive the specific mail.
The name of this service varies from country to country, and postal services in some countries offer more than one level of service under different names (e.g., "certified mail" and "registered mail" in the U.S.). See the country-specific information below for details.

Background
Traditionally, registered mail was a manual process which gave rise to a great variety of distinctive postal markings, like handstamps, and usage of registration labels. Many countries have issued special postal stationery and postage stamps for registered mail. Earlier similar services were known as Money Letters. Today, however, the registration process is largely computerized with barcode registration labels replacing the traditional analog labels having only a printed serial number.

Generally, the item is pre-paid with the normal postage rate and an additional charge known as a registration fee. Upon payment of this fee the sender is given a receipt, and (usually) a unique numbered registration label is affixed to the letter. As the letter travels from post office to post office and through any sorting office, it has to be signed for on a ledger. This process is completed when the letter is delivered and the receiver signs for the item. With computerization and barcode technology, much of the logging once done manually has become simpler and leads to greater options for the sender and receiver alike to access the status of their shipment via the internet. Many postal authorities provide tracing information for registered items on their website.

Internationally, the use of registered mail requires labels with a 13-digit reference number and corresponding barcode (UPU S10). The first two letters indicate registration (usually "RR") while the last 2 letters usually represent the country where the registered item was posted. E.g., RR913282511SG indicating Singapore, RB5584847749CN indicating China or RR123456785KR indicating South Korea.

History

The earliest reference to a mail registration system dates to July 1556, during the reign of Mary Tudor, of England. In that example,  This was likely for state security rather than mail security. In 1603, another Order of Council was made whereby all letters had to be recorded. This system was, in effect, a registration system, although it applied to all items sent via the post.

William Dockwra's 1680s London Penny Post also recorded all details on letters accepted for onward transmission, but unlike the General Post Office, gave compensation for losses.

The registration of letters as known today was introduced in 1841 in Great Britain. The letter had to be enclosed within a large sheet of green paper. The green sheet was addressed to the Post Office where the recipient lived. The green sheet was then used as a receipt and was returned to the office of origin after delivery. On 1 July 1858 the green sheet was replaced by a green silk ribbon and shortly afterwards by a green linen tape. In 1870 the tape was replaced by green string. On the introduction of postal stationery registration envelopes in 1878 the string was replaced by printed blue crossed lines. The blue crossed lines have survived on registered letters to the present day.

By country

Canada

Canada Post's Registered Mail service provides the sender with a mailing receipt, and upon delivery of the item, with the delivery date and a copy of the signature of the addressee or the addressee's representative. Registered Mail may include lettermail, documents, valuables, and literature for the blind, but does not include parcels.

Israel

Israel Post's Registered Mail service (doar rashum) provides the sender with a mailing receipt, and upon delivery of the item, the addressee must sign in order to obtain the item. The sender can monitor the item until its delivery, for items intended for 84 cities in Israel. A confirmation of delivery is sent to the sender for an additional fee. Registered Mail may include letters, postcards and printed matter.

On 25 November 2015 a preliminary reading of an amendment to Postal Law that forces the sender to mention his name on an item sent via registered mail, was passed. According to the press, the major opposition to this bill is the Courts Administration that sends most of its mail via registered mail with a confirmation of delivery, and claims that knowing the identity of the sender, many of their addressees will choose not to accept the items, thus delaying the legal proceedings they are a party to.

Sweden
PostNord's service Registered Mail (Swedish: Rekommenderad försändelse), often shortened as Rek, will only be delivered after the recipient have verified their identity with some form of ID card or BankID and had their personal identity number logged. The letter can also be collected by a courier, provided this courier carries both their own ID and the recipient's ID, or if the receiver have verified their identy in the app via BankID and sent a newly generated barcode to the courier. All Registered Mail is traceable in over 30 countries via PostNord's website and mobile app. Any domestic Registered Mail is insured for up to 10 000 SEK. International Registered Mail is insured for up to either 2 000 SEK or 10 000 SEK.

There is an optional added service called Personal Delivery (Swedish: Personlig utlämning) where only the recipient can collect the letter and denies all else, including couriers and power of attorney. Another optional added service is Advice of Delivery (Swedish: Mottagningsbevis) where a form signed by the receiver is sent back to the sender.

Registered Mail will be delivered to one of PostNord's service points, often a grocery store, where the identity of the receiver, and any courier, can be verified and logged before handing over the letter.

Since autumn 2017 Postnord no longer require signature for delivering registered mail from China Post. Registered mail from China Post is only traceable in the sense that the mailman marks the item as delivered when and if it is delivered to the recipients mailbox. No proof that the recipient has received the mail is collected.

United Kingdom
Since 1998, the Special Delivery service has been the only registered service offered by Royal Mail, after the old-style Registered Letter service was discontinued.

United States

The United States Postal Service offers two distinct services called certified mail and registered mail.

Certified mail

Certified mail allows the sender proof of mailing via a mailing receipt and, upon request, electronic verification that an article was delivered or that a delivery attempt was made. Some in-transit tracking and delivery confirmation information may be provided, but there is no formal chain of custody. Certified mail is restricted to Priority Mail and First Class Mail parcels and letters mailed within the United States and its territories (including APOs and FPOs). Each piece of certified mail is assigned a unique label number which serves as an official record of mailing of the item by the Postal Service.

U.S. certified mail began in 1955 after the idea was originated by Assistant U.S. Postmaster General Joseph Cooper. Certified mail may be selected for many reasons, not just for important business mailings. It is used by anyone who needs or wishes to provide a tracking number to the receiver as proof of delivery. It can also substitute, essentially, a proof of mailing form when a Postmark and/or scanned receipt is obtained at a Post Office. Contrary to popular belief, Certified Mail tracking is not accepted as proof of mailing in nearly all legal situations. The service also allows the receiver to track their package/envelope through the online system at usps.com using the unique tracking number provided by the mailer.

Certified Mail can be combined with (for an additional fee) or without "return receipt requested" service, often called "RRR." Standard return receipt requires use of PS Form 3811, which is a green postcard-sized paper: upon delivery, this paper is mailed back to the sender and serves as legal proof of delivery. USPS now offers Return Receipt Electronic (RRE) as an alternative to the traditional mailing back of the PS Form 3811 card. RRE provides electronic proof of delivery information. Many jurisdictions accept this as legal proof of delivery, but a minority do not. With RRE, when the letter reaches its final delivery destination, the letter carrier captures the signature, name and (portion of) address of the person that accepts the letter. The information is electronically stored, making it available to the sender in nearly real-time via an email with attached PDF. As indicated on the return receipt card, either the addressee or the addressee's "agent" may sign for the document. Because the process is automated and does not require postage, RRE is cheaper than traditional RRR.

Registered mail
Registered mail service is offered by the United States Postal Service as an extra service for First Class or Priority Mail shipments. Registered mail provides end-to-end security in locked containers. Registered mail custody records are maintained, but are not normally provided to the customer, unless a claim is filed.

In the United States, registered mail may be used to send classified material up to the Secret classified level.

Russia 

In Russia registered mail may be sent by several postal services. In Russian any registered mail is called "заказное". The postal service provides sender with tracking number of registered mail which may prove whether recipient received mail or not. Major postal service in Russia also provides service of notification of reception.

Gallery

See also
 Express mail
 Registered envelope
 Certified email

References
Notes

Bibliography

Further reading

Holyoake, Alan. (2012) Great Britain secured delivery of mail 1450-1862. The Great Britain Philatelic Society.

Philatelic terminology
Postal services
United States Postal Service